Mitopiella cinctipes is a species of harvestmen in a monotypic genus in the family Phalangiidae.

References

Harvestmen
Taxa named by Nathan Banks
Animals described in 1930
Monotypic arachnid genera